Otis Edgar Clymer (January 27, 1876 – February 27, 1926) was an American Major League Baseball player who was primarily a right fielder for four teams during his six-season career.  Born in Pine Grove, Pennsylvania, he played for the Pittsburgh Pirates, Washington Senators, Chicago Cubs, and the Boston Braves from 1905 to 1913.

Clymer's most notable moment came on October 2, 1908, when he hit for the cycle.  When he left Major League baseball, he played for the minor league Minneapolis Millers of the American Association from 1911 to 1914.

In 385 games over six seasons, Clymer posted a .267 batting average (355-for-1330) with 182 runs, 2 home runs, 98 RBI, 83 stolen bases and 99 bases on balls.

After his baseball career, which was hampered by constant leg injuries, Clymer became a car dealer.  He died at age 50 from an automobile accident in St. Paul, Minnesota. He is interred at Willow River Cemetery in Hudson, Wisconsin.

See also
 List of Major League Baseball players to hit for the cycle

References

External links
, or Retrosheet

1876 births
1926 deaths
Pittsburgh Pirates players
Washington Senators (1901–1960) players
Chicago Cubs players
Boston Braves players
Baseball players from Pennsylvania
Major League Baseball right fielders
Road incident deaths in Minnesota
Burials in Wisconsin
Buffalo Bisons (minor league) players
Minneapolis Millers (baseball) players